The 2020 Ivy League men's basketball tournament was the scheduled postseason men's basketball tournament for the Ivy League of the 2019–20 NCAA Division I men's basketball season. It was scheduled for March 14 and 15, 2020, at the Lavietes Pavilion on the campus of Harvard University in Boston. On March 10, 2020, the Ivy League announced it had cancelled the tournament due to the COVID-19 pandemic.  The Ivy League awarded Yale, which finished the season in first place, the league's automatic bid to the NCAA Tournament.

Seeds
The top four teams in the Ivy League regular-season standings qualify for the tournament and are seeded according to their records in conference play, resulting in a Shaughnessy playoff. If a tie for any of the top four positions exists, tiebreakers are applied in the following order:
 Head-to-head record between teams involved in the tie.
 Record against the top team(s) not involved in the tie in order of conference record, going down through the seedings until the tie is broken.
 Average of the teams' ranking in the following computer systems: NCAA NET, Sagarin, KenPom, and ESPN Basketball Percentage Index.

Schedule

Bracket
Had the tournament gone on as scheduled, this would have been the bracket:

See also
 2020 Ivy League women's basketball tournament

Footnotes

References

Tournament
Ivy League men's basketball tournament
Ivy League men's basketball tournament
Basketball competitions in Boston
College sports tournaments in Massachusetts
Ivy League men's basketball tournament
Ivy League men's basketball tournament
Ivy League men's basketball tournament